The Sparrow Mass is a mass in C major K. 220/196b, Mass No. 9, Missa brevis No. 5, composed by Wolfgang Amadeus Mozart in 1775 or 1776 in Salzburg. It was possibly first performed on 7 April 1776 in a mass for Easter at the Salzburg Cathedral. The nickname is derived from violin figures in the Hosanna which resemble bird chirping.

Background 

The mass may have been performed on 7 April 1776 during a celebration of Easter at the Salzburg Cathedral. According to a letter by Mozart, a copy was possibly loaned to the Heiligenkreuz Monastery the following year.

The Sparrow Mass is one of a series of five masses Mozart composed in 1775–1776 (or possibly 1775–1777), all of them with clarini trumpets, and so in the "trumpet key" of C major. Karl Geiringer notes that K. 220 was one of the models Franz Xaver Süssmayr used when completing Mozart's Requiem.

Structure and scoring 

The composition is short in duration as a missa brevis. Mozart does not even include the fugal conclusions to the Gloria and the Credo normally expected. It is richly orchestrated as a missa solemnis, for four soloists (soprano, alto, tenor, bass), a four-part choir (SATB), two trumpets, three trombones, timpani, strings and organ, the latter supplying figured bass for most of the duration. The mass is therefore sometimes termed a missa brevis et solemnis.

The setting of the Latin Order of Mass is structured in six movements. In the following table of the movements, the voices, markings, keys and time signatures are taken from the choral score.

{| class="wikitable plainrowheaders"
|-
! scope="col" | No.
! scope="col" | Part
! scope="col" | Incipit
! scope="col" | Vocal
! scope="col" | Marking
! scope="col" | Key
! scope="col" | Time
|-
| 1 || style="text-align: center;" |  ||  || SATB ||  || C major || 
|-
| 2 || style="text-align: center;" |  ||  || SATB + soloists ||  || C major || 
|-
| rowspan="3" | 3 || rowspan="3" style="text-align: center;" |  ||  || SATB + soloists ||  || rowspan="3" | C major || rowspan="3" | 
|-
|  || SATB || 
|-
|  || SATB || 
|-
| rowspan="3" | 4 || rowspan="3" style="text-align: center;"|  ||  || SATB ||  || rowspan="3" | C major || 
|-
|  || SATB ||  || rowspan="2" | 
|-
|  || SATB || 
|-
| rowspan="2" | 5 || rowspan="2" style="text-align: center;" |  ||  || soloists ||  || G major || rowspan="2" | 
|-
|  || SATB ||  || C major 
|-
| rowspan="2" | 6 || rowspan="2" style="text-align: center;" |  ||  || SATB + soloists ||  || rowspan="2" | C major || 
|-
|  || SATB ||  || 
|-
|}

Following the example of Joseph Haydn (such as in the ) and Michael Haydn, Mozart in this mass recalls the music of the Kyrie in the Dona nobis, something which Franz Xaver Süssmayr did in his completion of Mozart's Requiem.

References 

Notes

Bibliography

Scores

 
 

Books

Further reading 

 
 
 
 John A. Rice, "Adding Birds to Mozart's 'Sparrow Mass': An Arrangement with Children's Instruments by Paul Wranitzky"

Masses by Wolfgang Amadeus Mozart
Compositions in C major